Koo Dae-sung (born August 2, 1969) is a Korean former professional baseball pitcher. A left-handed pitcher, Koo formerly played for the Hanwha Eagles in the KBO League, as well as the New York Mets of Major League Baseball and the Orix BlueWave of Nippon Professional Baseball. He announced his retirement from Korean baseball on August 15, 2010. He last played for Geelong-Korea in the Australian Baseball League.

Early life
Koo is a left-handed pitcher despite being born right-handed. As a child, he broke his right arm, an injury so bad that it forced him to become left-handed. Koo attended Hanyang University.

Professional career

Hanwha Eagles
Koo began his professional career in 1993 with the Hanwha Eagles of the KBO League. In 1996, he won both a Gold Glove Award and the MVP of the KBO with a 1.88 earned run average, 18 wins, 24 saves and 183 strikeouts in 139 innings pitched.

Koo played for the South Korean national Olympic team in the 2000 games. He led his team to a bronze medal in 2000 by pitching a 3-1 complete game victory over Japan.

Orix BlueWave

In 2001, Koo joined the Orix BlueWave of the Japanese Pacific League. Though he was a reliever throughout his professional career, he became a starter for the team in 2002, recording the second best earned run average on the team. The Orix BlueWave merged with the Osaka Kintetsu Buffaloes in 2004, and he took the opportunity to announce his decision to play in the major leagues.

New York Mets
In 2005, the New York Mets signed Koo as a free agent. He pitched well as a reliever during spring training and was selected for the Mets' active roster as the season began. Despite his 35 years of age, and 12 years experience in Korea and Japan, he was considered a rookie by Major League Baseball in his first year. He made his Major League Debut on April 4, 2005 against the Cincinnati Reds, and pitched a perfect 8th inning, in the process collecting his first big league strikeout.

Koo's most memorable moment as a Major Leaguer occurred on May 21, 2005, when he recorded his only major league hit, a double off of Randy Johnson of the New York Yankees. This came right when Fox TV analyst Tim McCarver commented on how Koo's plate appearance was "the biggest give-up at-bat". Koo had taken two pitches and struck out looking on four pitches in his first at-bat, leading everyone to believe that he was ready to go up just to sit down again. On a 1-and-1 count, Koo crushed a deep line drive right over Bernie Williams's head one hop off the wall in right-center field. Upon reaching second base, the home crowd and his teammates in the dugout cheered and chanted "KOOOO!"  When asked about what he thought about the hit, Koo responded, "Other people say that I swung my bat with my eyes closed. But, of course I saw it – I hit it! It has been 18 years since I batted last – when I was in high school. Occasionally I went to the batting cages and swung the bat a couple of times. But, there really wasn’t any difference." A slow runner with little base running experience, Koo advanced to third base on a sacrifice bunt dropped by the following hitter, José Reyes. However, after Koo slowed down approaching third base, he re-accelerated and ran towards a vacant home plate left uncovered as Reyes was getting thrown out at first base. Yankees' catcher Jorge Posada promptly ran towards home in a foot race with Koo. Upon retrieving the thrown ball from first base, Posada applied the tag onto Koo's left shoulder as he slid head first towards home plate on a close play. Home plate umpire Chuck Meriwether called Koo safe on the play, extending the Mets' lead to 3-0. With that, the home crowd once again cheered and chanted his last name. His teammates enthusiastically greeted him, with celebrations ranging from his teammates brushing the dirt off his uniform to Doug Mientkiewicz fanning him with a towel. On his reception by his teammates, Koo said that "they said a lot of things. I just couldn't understand what. I think they were saying 'Good job.'" It was his final Major League at-bat.

Unfortunately, it was later revealed that Koo suffered a shoulder injury during this play while sliding into home plate. His stats suffered as well as a result thus forcing him to return to South Korea.

Return to Korea
On March 2, 2006, Koo rejoined the Hanwha Eagles when the Mets sold his contract to them.

Sydney Blue Sox
In a press conference on 22 August 2010, Koo revealed he was to play for the Sydney Blue Sox in the Australian Baseball League. Koo made his debut in the opening game of the 2010–11 Australian Baseball League regular season. With his team up 1-0 against the Canberra Cavalry, he recorded the final out by striking out Nick Kimpton to earn the first save in the Australian Baseball League. He finished the season with 12 saves, 1.00 earned run average and  opposition average against. Owing to this performance Koo was named Reliever of the Year.

After spending the first two seasons as the Blue Sox closer, he was shifted into the 8th inning role when Matthew Williams took over as the team's closer. However, in the 2013–14 season, Williams moved to the Adelaide Bite and Koo was once again named Sydney's closer, posting a stellar 2.08 earned run average with 11 saves.

In four seasons of the Australian Baseball League, Koo had a 2.16 earned run average with 31 saves.

In 2016, Koo was the pitching coach for the Blue Sox.

Team Australia
Koo was selected for the Australian national baseball team in two spring training exhibition matches against the Los Angeles Dodgers and the Arizona Diamondbacks.

Geelong-Korea
After managing Geelong-Korea for two seasons, Koo came out of retirement pitching an inning at 48 years old - making him the oldest player to have played in the Australian Baseball League. On January 19, 2023, Koo came out of retirement for the second time to play against the Adelaide Giants at 53 years old, breaking his own record in the process. He pitched one inning and recorded two strikeouts. He then pitched two more times on subsequent nights, recording one hit, two walks, and two unearned runs against six batters.

See also 
 List of KBO career saves leaders

References

External links 

Career statistics and player information from KBO League
 Dae-Sung Koo at Sydney Blue Sox, Australian Baseball League
Yahoo! profile

Koo sailing (MLB article about Koo's game on May 21, 2005, also includes video of his two plays)

1969 births
2006 World Baseball Classic players
Baseball players at the 2000 Summer Olympics
Hanwha Eagles players
Hanyang University alumni
KBO League Most Valuable Player Award winners
KBO League pitchers
Korean Series MVPs
Living people
Major League Baseball pitchers
Major League Baseball players from South Korea
Medalists at the 2000 Summer Olympics
New York Mets players
Nippon Professional Baseball pitchers
Olympic baseball players of South Korea
Olympic bronze medalists for South Korea
Olympic medalists in baseball
Orix BlueWave players
Perth Heat players
Sportspeople from Daejeon
South Korean expatriate baseball players in Japan
South Korean expatriate baseball players in the United States
South Korean expatriate baseball players in Australia
Sydney Blue Sox players